Hindu Singh Sodha, (born 2 May 1956) is a well known activist for the cause of Pakistani Refugees in India. He resides in Jodhpur Rajasthan but travels for most of the time meeting refugees. He is the founder of Pak Vishthapit Sangh (1999), Seemant Lok Sangathan (2005) and Universal Just Action Society – UJAS (2008).

Family background

Hindu Singh's family belongs to Chachro in Tharparkar, within Sindh province of Pakistan. His father was a Pakistani, while his mother was an Indian from Rajasthan. At the time of his birth his family was living in Pakistan but he was born at maternal home in India.  
His cousin Late Thakur Laxman Singhji Sodha was the only minority cabinet member in erstwhile West Pakistan government under Gen. Ayub Khan. Thakur Laxman Singhji Sodha also migrated to India before the 1971 Indo-Pak war.  The family of Hindu Singh Sodha migrated to India before 10 months of the 1971 Indo-Pak war i.e. on 8 February 1971.

Education
Till Class Class 10th Hindu Singh Sodha studied in a school in Chachro, Pakistan, after migration to India he completed the schooling from Chopasani School, Jodhpur, Later he completed Graduation and L.L.B. from Jai Narayan Vyas University, Jodhpur University,

Social and Political life
College days: He was renowned student leader of his time who himself floated a student organisation & was founder President of student body organisation called the Chhatra Sangharash Samiti. Student politics during the time was volatile and due to his intervention the campus became a platform for debates on relevant issues. He is given credit of motivating students to evolve from the mindset of caste based politics to politics based on ideology. Chaatra Sangharsh Samiti is still active in Student Politics of Jodhpur though Sodha is not actively associated with it.

Bharat Bandh (1981): In the 'Bharat Bandh' agitation of 1981 called on the motion of Trade unions of India Sodha was the first one to get arrested in Jodhpur and the agitation though remained peaceful was successful.

Darbi Strike:  Sodha was the convener of Trade union movement in western Rajasthan and due to his efforts all major Trade Unions participated in the Darbi Strike which was the longest strike in the agitation history of western Rajasthan.

Publication of 'Jan Pataaka' fortnightly (1986): Sodha was the sole person behind publication of a fortnightly titled 'Jan Pataaka' (Peoples Flag).

Participation in Social movements: Sodha also participated in various social movements including the movement relating to the Right to Information in Rajasthan.

Urmul (1991): 
In 1991 for the first time he formally joined an NGO known as Urmul which was functioning in Bikaner area. The founder of Urmul Late Sh.Sanjoy Ghosh wanted Mr.Sodha to work in the Bikaner area . Unfortunately Sh. Ghosh was later killed by ULFA militants while working for backwards in Majuli Islands. Mr. Sodha agreed to work with the NGO only on the condition that he would that he being permitted to work exclusively for refugees from Pakistan living in Bikaner area of Rajasthan.

Working for Pakistani Refugees/Migrants: 
After a stint with Urmul he left the NGO to work for the cause dearest to his heart on his own. During same time the 1971 settlers were still looking for proper rehabilitation. On the other hand, situation in Pakistan started becoming worse due to aftermath of Babri mosque demolition on 6 December 1992. Minority Hindus were attacked & persecuted in various manners. Hindu Singh Sodha decided to work exclusively for the cause of refugees and since then which is more than 21 years from then, he still making efforts to help the refugees most of them are Meghwals(SCs) and Bhils (STs) from Pakistan.

Dharna Outside Rajasthan Assembly (1998): 
He made constant trips throughout border in the refugee settlements in Rajasthan. In 1998 he staged a Dharna in front of Rajasthan state assembly. The then Chief Minister Sh. Bhairon Singh Shekhawat assured on the floor of house to take the cause of the Pakistani refugees made him to finish the dharna.

'Pak Visthapit Sangh' (पाक विस्थापित संघ) (1999): 
In 1999 Sodha founded the Pak Visthapit Sangh and as founder President of Pak Vishthapit Sangh he continued to demand to resolve the issue of migrants . Till then the Citizenship issue became relevant as around 13,000 refugees from Pakistan were eligible to get Indian citizenship but they were not considered by the Government.

Sodha demanded the delegation of the powers of granting citizenship to District Collectors as was the position till 1986 after which the powers were centralised. Then C.M. Mr. Ashok Gehlot invited him for talks & a Review Committee was formed by the State Government under the Chairmanship of Principal Secretary Home. He was the only non-Government member in that Review Committee. His presence in the committee made it possible to recommend the Centre for delegating the powers to Collectors.

In the year 2004 Sodha again made representations to the then C.M. Mrs. Vasundhara Raje who conceded to the demands of the Refugees. By the time he was able to get Indian Citizenships to about 13000 Refugees. He made representations to make a Permanent Cell for Refugees which was duly appointed in 2004 under the Chairmanship of Principal Secretary Home, Government of Rajasthan.

Sodha is continuously advocating for rail link between Sindh & Rajasthan since 2005.

In 2005 he formed another organisation Seemant lok Sangathan to work on cross border peace initiative as the border of Rajasthan has an important issue of divided families. He organised a refugee conference in December 2005. this was a unique event of its kind as all refugees from south Asia participated in that. Representatives from Burma, Tibet, Chitgaon hill track, Tamils & also Kashmir pandits participated.  again in December 2010 he convened a conference of conflict & displacement in Delhi.

Seemant Lok Sanghathan(सीमान्त लोक संगठन) (2005):

In 2005 Sodha formed the Seemant Lok Sangathan to take up the issue of Refugees on a larger canvass. Later, he was appointed a member of High Power Committee under the Chairmanship of Additional Chief Secretary Development in 2007. He is still a representative in the state committee under the chairmanship of ACS development & also member in both the committees under the chairmanship of divisional commissioners of Jodhpur & Bikaner respectively in the capacity of President, Seemant Lok Sangathan. Due to his efforts for the first time refugees coming on pilgrim visa were permitted to live in India by government of India. This time situation is worst in Pakistan he met almost every political party to make the common consensus on the issue & due to his efforts in September & December 2012 serious debate in both the houses of parliament effected in which all Political parties favoured the cause of Pakistani refugees.  He himself led a demonstration in front of State Assembly again in October 2012.
 
Universal Just Action Society – UJAS(2008):

In 2008, Seemant Lok Sangathan was registered as a non-governmental organisation under the name Universal Just Action Society (UJAS).  SLS and UJAS are synonymous. UJAS serves as an NGO with international recognition, while refugee communities most commonly refer to the organisation as Seemant Lok Sangathan.

UJAS/SLS continues to promote and accomplish the original objectives of SLS and PVS at their founding. At the heart of the organisation lie the direct efforts of Mr. Hindu Singh Sodha, who has dedicated his life to this issue and to aiding Pakistani refugees in whatever way he can.

Though India is not signatory of UN convention of refugees of 1951 neither had signed its protocol of 1967 but under his leadership the issue of Pakistani Hindu refugees is being taken seriously.

Sodha is working with  refugees of Pakistan living in Rajasthan itself wherein 10,000 people migrated in 1965 and 90,000 people migrated in 1971, about 20,000 have migrated since then till now.

Apart from Rajasthan Sodha is also active for the cause of Refugees in the States of Haryana, Delhi, and Gujarat as well as for Pakistani migrants taking refuge in states of Madhya Pradesh & Chhattisgarh.

Sodha participated in the People's SAARC Conference organised by civil society in Delhi, Kathmandu and Nepal on various occasions. Due to the efforts of Sodha, it was for the first time that the issue of refugees was included in the agenda of Peoples SAARC conference held in Kathmandu in the year 2008.

Sodha also participated in South Asia social forum meeting in Dhaka in 2011

References

1956 births
Living people
People from Jodhpur
Social workers from Rajasthan
Social workers
Indian people of Pakistani descent
Pakistani emigrants to India
Pakistani people of Indian descent
Pakistani people of Rajasthani descent
Pakistani Hindus